This is the discography of American pop group Tony Orlando and Dawn.

Albums

Studio albums

Compilation albums

Video albums

Singles

Notes

References

Discographies of American artists
Pop music discographies